Alex Sadkowsky (born 16 January 1934 in Zurich, Switzerland) is a Swiss artist, painter, illustrator, graphic artist, photographer, performer and author.

Biography
Alex Sadkowsky was born in Zurich, Switzerland in 1934. His father, Hipolit from Jablona Krey Sokolowsy in Russia-Poland, was portraitists and restorer in Vienna/Zurich/Salzburg, like Hipolit's Greek mother Eugenie Patronella Duntsa. Sadkowsky's mother, named Erika, and his siblings were also artists. In the age of 4, he chose to either be an artist or a king. He decided to work as a jazz musician, a traveling salesman for washing machines and shavers, a Spanish teacher and as a step dancer until he was 24 years old. In addition, he worked as a boxer for a short period of time. Furthermore, his life includes diverse exhibitions, experiences and publications of writings:

 1946 He wrote short poems and drew paintings. Short drawing lessons by Walter Jonas and Charles Kissling.
 1957 Marriage with Sonja Blattmann; one daughter and three sons. 6 months stay in Spain. Student at the Academie de Bellas Artes.
 1958 Freelancer (for artist). Shared an atelier with the artist Friedrich Kunath for a while.
 1960 Several stays in India. studied Buddhisms in Darbanga and Darjeeling.
 1961 Travel to Venice, Italy.
 1963 Stay in London, UK. Meeting with Francis Bacon. First stay in Ireland (out of 70 stays). Co founder of Group 65. First texts of the roman "Die Chinesische Wespe – Geschichte einer Liebe" created in Dublin.
 1965 Three short movies: "Kaninchenleben", "Der Blinde" and "Wieviel Erde braucht der Mensch".
 1966 Travel to Russia with Max Frisch, Tankred Dorst and Marianne Oehlers.
 1970 Stedelijk museum gives Sadkowsky an atelier. He devised works about "Animal metaphysicum". "Wilhelm Tell" was created. Travel to Mexico and Guatemala.
 1972 Travel to Greece. Solo exhibition in the museums from Turku and Tampere.
 1973 Travel to Balkan with a stay in Istanbul.
 1977 Zurich: Solo Exhibition in the Taylor Gallery in Dublin.
 1983 New paintings, drawings and sculptures under the title "Kommunikation in Wolle".
 1984 The novel «Die gelbe Frau oder Schriftsymbiose zweier Blondinen» was finished.
 1985 – 1993 Travel to Italy, Greece, Holland, Spain, Yugoslavia, Portugal, Malta, Mexico, Ireland, France and the USA.
 1995 Travel to Hang Dong, Pudoi in Sansai.
 1996 – 2006 Received 8 recognition prices for literature.
 1998 New project: "Neunundneunzig neue Zürcher Märchen".
 2000 After 9 1⁄2  years: He finished the roman "Die Chinesische Wespe – Geschichte einer Liebe".
 2005/06 Novel "Die Umwandlung" in progress. Paintings and Sculptures: "Etymologie - Kolloquium".
 2017 Gallery in Feldmeile.

In 1986, Alex Sadkowsky emphasized:

Writings 

 Die Umwandlung. Novel. Publisher: Pudel und Pinscher Wädenswil Verlag 2018, .
 Einziger Lockruf. Poems. Publisher: Howeg-Verlag Zurich 2018, .
 Der Titel II. Ein Titelroman. Collection of various texts. Publisher: Howeg-Verlag Zurich 2014, .
 Lindenhof. Poems and short prose works, Publisher: Littera Autoren-Verlag Zurich 2010, .
 Foto-Bio-Kultografie. Publisher: Scheidegger & Spiess Verlag Zurich 2009, .
 Ich warte auf den ewigen Sommer. Poems. Publisher: Orte-Verlag beregg AI / Zurich 2007, .
 Die Chinesische Wespe. roman. Publisher: Bilger-Verlag Zurich 2002, .
 Schrittfehler beim Spaziergang durch den einbaumigen Park. Poems. Publisher: Orte-Verlag Zelg/ Wolfhalden/ Zurich 1992, .
 Die Munterkeit des Galans auf dem Glatteis. Poems. Publisher: Orte-Verlag Zelg/ Wolfhalden/ Zurich 1992, .
 Der Titel I. Publisher: Lutz-Verlag Zurich 1991, .
 Metamorphosen der Wirklichkeit. monograph about AS: Publisher: Hans Heinz Holz ABC Verlag Zurich 1986, .
 Frauenleben I. Publisher: ABC Verlag Zürich 1980, .
 Foto-Bio-Kultografie 1. Publisher: Lutz-Verlag Zurich 1975.
 Kofferraum der Welt. Publisher: Niggli-Verlag St. Gallen 1971
 The Song of the Police. Publisher: Jasonya-Verlag Zürich 1962

Expositions 

 2019 Exposition in Wettingen, Aarau and Dublin.
 2015/16 Silver. Teres Wydler. Ruedi Bechtler. Alex Sadkowsky, Kunstzeughaus in Rapperswil (SG).
 2014 Helmhaus Zurich.
 1997 Gallery in Tuttlingen.
 1996 Taylor Galleries in Dublin.
 1993 "Wer weiss und blau und Geld" House of arts Zurich.
 1991 Jaski Art Gallery Amsterdam.
 1986 Gallery Jamileh Weber Zurich.
 1983 New drawing, paintings and sculptures Gallery Jamileh Weber Zurich Release der CD Single Banktrust with Lyrics from Alex Sadkowsky.
 1982 Galeria Flaviana Locarno.
 1981 House of arts Glarus, Instituto Aleman in Guadalajara, Museo Santo Domingo in Oaxaca Mexico.
 1979 Poster campaign "Was lieben Sie am meisten an Zürich? Die letzten drei Buchstaben".
 1978 Gallery Jamileh Weber on Art '78 Basel.
 1977 Paintings and drawings created in America/Gallery Jamileh Weber Zurich.
 1977 America in europ shows Xerox-pictures in the Nikon Gallery Zurich/Exposition Taylor Galleries Dublin.
 1975–1976 Retro perspektive in Gallery Blackbox and in the shopwindow from the art house in Zurich.
 1972 Museum in Turku, Tampere and Helsinki with movie premier.
 1971 Museum for "Allerheiligen Schaffhausen".
 1970 Exhibition of portraits Eugene Ionesco Theater in Zurich.
 1969 Double exhibition swimming room Gallery Obere Zäune in Zurich.
 1969 Gallery Krikhaar Amsterdam.
 1968 Zurich: Retroperspektive—Paintings and graphics.
 1967 Art club: Stuttgart/Gallery Castelnuovo Asc premier Zurich.
 1954 Art room "Elsässergasse" Zurich.

Literature 

 Hans Heinz Holz: Alex Sadkowsky: Metamorphosen der Wirklichkeit/Metamorphosis of reality, Publisher: ABC-Verlag, 1986 (German/English)

References

External links
 http://www.sikart.ch/KuenstlerInnen.aspx?id=4001441
 http://art-dock-zh.ch/uploads/pdf/mailing/ZuercherAlmanach_Nizon.pdf
 https://www.tagesanzeiger.ch/kultur/Das-Weltwahninventar/story/26265903
 https://www.tagesanzeiger.ch/zuerich/stadt/Das-bewegte-Leben-des-Alex-Sadkowsky/story/27676713

Swiss male artists
20th-century Swiss artists
1934 births
Living people
20th-century Swiss male artists